In Greek mythology, Laodicus (Ancient Greek: Λαόδικος means 'tried by the people') may refer to the following figures:

Laodicus, father of Theognete, one of the possible mothers of Jason by Aeson.
Laodicus, father of Europe who was one of the sacrificial victims of Minotaur.
Laodicus, one of the Suitors of Penelope who came from Zacynthus along with other 43 wooers. He, with the other suitors, was shot dead by Odysseus with the assistance of Eumaeus, Philoetius, and Telemachus.

Notes

References 

 Apollodorus, The Library with an English Translation by Sir James George Frazer, F.B.A., F.R.S. in 2 Volumes, Cambridge, MA, Harvard University Press; London, William Heinemann Ltd. 1921. ISBN 0-674-99135-4. Online version at the Perseus Digital Library. Greek text available from the same website.
Maurus Servius Honoratus, In Vergilii carmina comentarii. Servii Grammatici qui feruntur in Vergilii carmina commentarii; recensuerunt Georgius Thilo et Hermannus Hagen. Georgius Thilo. Leipzig. B. G. Teubner. 1881. Online version at the Perseus Digital Library.

Suitors of Penelope
Attican characters in Greek mythology
Thessalian mythology